The 2018 United States House of Representatives elections in Maryland were held on November 6, 2018, electing the eight U.S. representatives from the State of Maryland, one from each of the state's eight congressional districts. The elections coincided with the elections of other offices, including a gubernatorial election, other elections to the House of Representatives, elections to the United States Senate, and various state and local elections.

Overview

By district
Results of the 2018 United States House of Representatives elections in Maryland by district:

District 1

The incumbent is Republican Andy Harris, who has represented the district since 2011. Harris was re-elected with 67% of the vote in 2016.

The Democratic Congressional Campaign Committee included Maryland's 1st congressional district on its initial list of Republican-held seats considered targets in 2018.

Democratic primary
 Michael Brown
 Jesse Colvin, Army Ranger
 Allison Galbraith, small business owner
 Erik Lane
 Michael Pullen, former attorney
 Steve Worton

Primary results

Republican primary
 Martin Elborn, law enforcement
 Andy Harris, incumbent
 Lamont Taylor, small businessman

Primary results

General election

Results

District 2

The incumbent is Democrat Dutch Ruppersberger, who has represented the district since 2003. Ruppersberger was re-elected with 62% of the vote in 2016.

Democratic primary
 Jake Pretot
 Dutch Ruppersberger, incumbent

Primary results

Republican primary
 Liz Matory, small business owner
 Hubert Owens Jr.
 Mark Shell
 Mitchell Toland Jr.

Primary results

General election

Results

District 3

The incumbent is Democrat John Sarbanes, who has represented the district since 2007. Sarbanes was re-elected with 63% of the vote in 2016.

Democratic primary
 Adam DeMarco
 John Rea
 Eduardo Rosas, U.S. Navy (Retired), Iraq War combat veteran
 John Sarbanes, incumbent

Primary results

Republican primary
 Charles Anthony
 Rob Seyfferth

Primary results

General election

Results

District 4

The incumbent is Democrat Anthony Brown, who has represented the district since 2017. Brown was elected with 74% of the vote in 2016.

Democratic primary
 Anthony Brown, incumbent

Primary results

Republican primary
 George McDermott

Primary results

Libertarian Party
Dave Bishop

General election

Results

District 5

The incumbent is Democrat Steny Hoyer, who has represented the district since 1981. Hoyer was re-elected with 67% of the vote in 2016.

Democratic primary
 Dennis Fritz
 Steny Hoyer, incumbent

Primary results

Republican primary
 William Devine III
 Johnny Rice

Primary results

General election

Results

District 6

The incumbent is Democrat John Delaney, who has represented the district since 2013. Delaney was re-elected with 56% of the vote in 2016.

Delaney later retired to seek the Democratic Party's nomination for President of the United States in 2020.

Democratic primary
 Andrew J. Duck, Democratic candidate for Maryland's 6th congressional district in 2006 and 2010
 George English
 Chris Graves
 Nadia Hashimi, emergency pediatrician and best-selling author
 Christopher Hearsey
 Roger Manno, member of the Maryland Senate for the 19th district
 Aruna Miller, member of the Maryland House of Delegates for the 15th district
 David Trone, businessman and candidate for Maryland's 8th congressional district in 2016

Primary results

Republican primary
 Kurt Elsasser, former U.S. Marine
 Amie Hoeber, former Deputy Under Secretary of the Army and nominee in 2016
 Lisa Lloyd, nurse practitioner
 Brad Rohrs, realtor

Primary results

Endorsements

General election

Debates
Complete video of debate, October 23, 2018

Results

District 7

The incumbent was Elijah Cummings. He had represented the district since 1996. Cummings was re-elected with 76.4% of the vote in 2018.

Democratic primary
 Anthony Carter Sr.
 Elijah Cummings, incumbent representative
 John Moser
 Charles Smith
 Charles Stokes

Primary results

Republican primary
 Ray Bly
 Richmond Davis, attorney
 Thomas Harris
 William Newton
 Michael Pearson

Primary results

General election

Results

District 8

The incumbent is Democrat Jamie Raskin, who has represented the district since 2017. Raskin was elected with 61% of the vote in 2016.

Democratic primary
 Utam Paul
 Jamie Raskin, incumbent
 Summer Spring

Primary results

Republican primary
 Bridgette Cooper
 John Walsh
 Victor Williams

Primary results

General election

Results

References

External links
Candidates at Vote Smart 
Candidates at Ballotpedia 
Campaign finance at FEC 
Campaign finance at OpenSecrets

Official campaign websites for first district candidates
Jesse Colvin (D) for Congress
Andy Harris (R) for Congress
Jenica Martin (L) for Congress 	

Official campaign websites for second district candidates
Michael Carney (L) for Congress
Dutch Ruppersberger (D) for Congress
Liz Matory (R) for Congress

Official campaign websites for third district candidates
J. David Lashar (L) for Congress 
John Sarbanes (D) for Congress

Official campaign websites for fourth district candidates
Dave Bishop (L) for Congress
Anthony Brown (D) for Congress
George McDermott (R) for Congress

Official campaign websites for fifth district candidates
Steny Hoyer (D) for Congress
William Devine III (R) for Congress
Patrick Elder (G) for Congress

Official campaign websites for sixth district candidates
Kevin Caldwell (L) for Congress
George Gluck (G) for Congress
David Trone (D) for Congress
Amie Hoeber (R) for Congress

Official campaign websites for seventh district candidates
Elijah Cummings (D) for Congress
Richmond Davis (R) for Congress
David Griggs (L) for Congress

Official campaign websites for eighth district candidates
Jamie Raskin (D) for Congress
John Walsh (R) for Congress
Jasen Wunder (L) for Congress

Maryland
2018
United States House